Britain and the World (BATW) is a scholarly society focusing on Britain's role in the world from the sixteenth century to the present. It publishes a biannual academic journal published by Edinburgh University Press entitled Britain and the World: Historical Journal of The British Scholar Society, as well as a "Britain and the World" book series with Palgrave Macmillan. BATW also organizes a yearly academic conference, which has been held in both US and UK locations. Launched in 2006 under the name "The British Scholar Society," BATW is currently chaired by Martin Farr of Newcastle University. The chair of its advisory board is Linda Colley of Princeton University. BATW describes its membership as made up of "individuals from around the world who share a common interest in Britain, its history, and its interactions with the wider world."

References

External links 
 https://britainandtheworld.org/

Area studies journals
Publications established in 2008
History journals
Academic organisations based in the United Kingdom
2008 establishments in the United Kingdom